The following is a list of notable deaths in September 2022.

Entries for each day are listed alphabetically by surname. A typical entry lists information in the following sequence:
 Name, age, country of citizenship at birth, subsequent country of citizenship (if applicable), reason for notability, cause of death (if known), and reference.

September 2022

1
Mahmoud Ahmadzadeh, 89, Iranian engineer and politician, minister of industries and mines (1979–1980).
Guy-Pierre Baumann, 82, French chef and restaurateur, owner of the Kammerzell House (1987–2009).
Jakez Cornou, 87, French historian and ethnologist.
John Dapcevich, 95, American politician, mayor of Sitka, Alaska (1971–1975, 1979–1985, 1987–1989).
Barbara Ehrenreich, 81, American author (Nickel and Dimed, Bait and Switch, Dancing in the Streets) and political activist, stroke.
John Gamble, 74, American baseball player (Detroit Tigers).
Bo Harwood, 76, American sound engineer (Felicity, Six Feet Under, Pee-wee's Playhouse) and composer.
Albert Hasibuan, 83, Indonesian lawyer and politician, member of the Presidential Advisory Council (2012–2015) and Congress (1971–1997).
François-Bernard Huyghe, 71, French essayist and political scientist.
Rashleigh Jackson, 93, Guyanese politician, minister for foreign affairs (1978–1990).
Ľudovít Komadel, 94, Slovak Olympic swimmer (1952) and sports physician.
Adam Kułach, 57, Polish diplomat.
Ravil Maganov, 67, Russian petroleum executive (Lukoil), fall.
Phillip Mann, 80, British-born New Zealand writer (Master of Paxwax, The Fall of the Families), teacher and theatre director.
Jack Marchal, 75, French musician, illustrator, and political activist.
Abbas Maroufi, 65, Iranian writer.
Diane Noomin, 75, American underground cartoonist and editor (Wimmen's Comix, Twisted Sisters), uterine cancer.
Mary Roy, 89, Indian educator and women's rights activist.
Hermann Schaufler, 75, German politician, member of the Landtag of Baden-Württemberg (1980–2001).
Earnie Shavers, 78, American boxer.
István Szalay, 78, Hungarian mathematician and politician, MP (1998–2002).
Robert L. Vining Jr., 91, American lawyer, judge of the U.S. District Court for Northern Georgia (since 1979).
Kenneth Wernicke, 89, American aerospace engineer.
Erna Beth Yackel, 83, American mathematician.
Yang Yongsong, 103, Chinese military officer.
Zhu Yinghao, 93, Chinese transformer expert.

2
Mujib Rahman Ansari, 39–40, Afghan cleric, bombing.
Bamba Bakya, 41, Indian playback singer, cardiac arrest.
Denis Berthiaume, 53, Canadian academic and researcher, assisted suicide.
Mišo Cebalo, 77, Croatian chess grandmaster.
Jordi Cervelló, 86, Spanish composer, pneumonia.
Joseph Cheng Tsai-fa, 90, Taiwanese Roman Catholic prelate, bishop of Tainan (1991–2004) and archbishop of Taipei (2004–2007).
Ian Cockbain, 64, English cricketer (Lancashire).
Frank Drake, 92, American astronomer and astrophysicist (Drake equation), designer of the Arecibo message.
Manuel Duarte, 77, Portuguese footballer (Leixões, Sporting CP, national team).
Peter Eckersley, 44, Australian computer scientist (Let's Encrypt, Privacy Badger, HTTPS Everywhere) and cyber security activist, cancer.
María Guðmundsdóttir, 29, Icelandic alpine ski racer, primary splenic angiosarcoma.
Georgios Kalamidas, 77, Greek judge, president of the Supreme Civil and Criminal Court (2009–2011).
Barry Muir, 84, Australian rugby player (Tweed Heads Seagulls, Queensland, national team).
Donal O'Keeffe, 59, Irish Gaelic footballer (Clonmel Commercials, Tipperary), injuries sustained cycling accident.
T. V. Sankaranarayanan, 77, Indian Carnatic vocalist.
Ramveer Upadhyay, 65, Indian politician, Uttar Pradesh MLA (since 1996), cancer.
Drummie Zeb, 62, English reggae musician (Aswad) and record producer. 
Zenno Rob Roy, 22, Japanese Thoroughbred racehorse, heart failure.

3
Martin Bailie, 60, Irish hurler (Ballygalget).
Yuri Bashkatov, 54, Moldovan swimmer, Olympic silver medalist (1988, 1992).
Eva Børresen, 101, German-born Norwegian ceramist.
Scott Campbell, 65, Canadian ice hockey player (Winnipeg Jets, St. Louis Blues), cancer.
Alarico Gattia, 94, Italian comic artist and illustrator.
Jeff German, 69, American journalist (Las Vegas Review-Journal, Las Vegas Sun), stabbed.
Shavez Hart, 29, Bahamian Olympic sprinter (2016), shot.
Takanori Hayashi, 84, Japanese politician, member of the House of Representatives (1969–1980).
Specs Howard, 96, American radio presenter.
Paddy Kerrigan, 94, Irish Gaelic footballer (Rhode).
Herbert Kohler Jr., 83, American manufacturing executive, chairman of Kohler Co. (1972–2015).
Sterling Lord, 102, American literary agent.
Dieter Schulte, 82, German trade unionist, chairman of DGB (1994–2002).

4
Gazi Mazharul Anwar, 79, Bangladeshi film director, producer and lyricist (Nil Akasher Niche, Kokhono Megh Kokhono Brishti, Meyeti Ekhon Kothay Jabe).
Janusz Batugowski, 74, Polish football player and manager (KSZO Ostrowiec Świętokrzyski).
Robert Bintz, 92, Luxembourgian Olympic cyclist (1948).
Bo Brundin, 85, Swedish actor (Tales of the Gold Monkey, The Great Waldo Pepper, Russian Roulette).
Coroebus, 3, Irish Thoroughbred racehorse.
Heidemarie Fischer, 77, German politician, member of the Abgeordnetenhaus of Berlin (1986–1990, 1995–2006).
Wes Freed, 58, American outsider artist, colorectal cancer.
Alain Goldmann, 90, French rabbi.
Rodrigo González Torres, 80, Chilean politician, deputy (since 2002) and mayor of Viña del Mar (1992–1994, 1996–2000).
Edward Hulewicz, 84, Polish singer and composer.
Boris Lagutin, 84, Russian boxer, Olympic champion (1964, 1968).
Helen Matthews Lewis, 97, American sociologist, historian, and activist.
Cyrus Mistry, 54, Indian-Irish automotive executive, chairman of the Tata Group (2012–2016), traffic collision.
Ramachandran Mokeri, 75, Indian stage actor, lung disease.
Arthur Cotton Moore, 87, American architect.
Hendrik Nielsen, 80, Greenlandic politician, MP (1979–1991).
Ernst Pfister, 75, German politician, member of the Landtag of Baden-Württemberg (1980–2011).
Ram Naresh Rawat, 60, Indian politician, Uttar Pradesh MLA (since 2017), liver disease.
Art Rosenbaum, 83, American visual artist and musician, Grammy winner (2008).
Isolde Schmitt-Menzel, 92, German artist (Die Sendung mit der Maus), author, and photographer.
Thorkild Simonsen, 96, Danish politician, minister of the interior (1997–2000) and mayor of Aarhus (1982–1997).
Peter Straub, 79, American novelist (Julia, Ghost Story, The Talisman), complications from a broken hip.
John Till, 76, Canadian guitarist (Full Tilt Boogie Band).
Saint-Ange Vebobe, 69, French basketball player (JA Vichy, Antibes, national team).
Joel Wells, 86, American football player (Montreal Alouettes, New York Giants).
Zhan Bingyan, 93, Chinese urologist and politician, member of the National People's Congress (1993–1998).

5
Gias Uddin Ahmed, 68, Bangladeshi politician, MP (2008–2014).
Margrith Bigler-Eggenberger, 89, Swiss jurist and politician.
Patricia Burke Brogan, 90, Irish playwright, novelist, and poet.
Virginia Dwan, 90, American art collector and patron.
Hans Eder, 87, German football player (Tennis Borussia Berlin, Hertha BSC) and manager (Hertha BSC).
Hermann Gummel, 99, German physicist.
Merlin Hanbury-Tracy, 7th Baron Sudeley, 83, British peer, member of the House of Lords (1960–1999).
Moon Landrieu, 92, American politician, HUD secretary (1979–1981), mayor of New Orleans (1970–1978), and member of the Louisiana House of Representatives (1960–1966).
Robin Lesh, 84, Australian tennis player.
Li Dequn, 77, Chinese material scientist, member of the Chinese Academy of Engineering.
Li Xiyin, 96, Chinese lexicographer and politician, member of the National People's Congress (1988–1998).
Mark Littell, 69, American baseball player (Kansas City Royals, St. Louis Cardinals), complications from heart surgery.
Shirley McKechnie, 96, Australian dancer and choreographer.
Dale McRaven, 83, American television writer and producer (Perfect Strangers, Mork & Mindy, The Partridge Family), complications from lung cancer.
Mariella Mehr, 74, Swiss writer.
Guy Morriss, 71, American football player (Philadelphia Eagles, New England Patriots) and coach (Kentucky), complications from Alzheimer's disease.
Jeff Robson, 95, New Zealand badminton and tennis player.
Walter Suggs, 83, American football player (Houston Oilers).
Jürgen Theuerkauff, 87, German fencer, Olympic bronze medalist (1960).
Lars Vogt, 51, German concert pianist, conductor (Orchestre de chambre de Paris) and festival director (Spannungen), cancer.
Eva Zeller, 99, German poet and novelist.

6
Olga Andrianova, 70, Russian curler and curling coach.
Salvatore Biasco, 82, Italian economist and politician, deputy (1996–2001).
Ligia Borowczyk, 89, Polish actress (La Jetée, Goto, Island of Love).
Arvind Giri, 64, Indian politician, Uttar Pradesh MLA (since 1996), heart attack.
Herman, 90, American Orthodox prelate, primate of the Orthodox Church in America (2002–2008).
Just Jaeckin, 82, French film director (Emmanuelle, Story of O, Lady Chatterley's Lover), photographer and sculptor.
Umesh Katti, 61, Indian politician, Karnataka MLA (1985–2004, since 2008), cardiac arrest.
Vic Kohring, 64, American politician, member of the Alaska House of Representatives (1995–2007), traffic collision.
Tatyana Koryagina, 79, Russian economist and politician, deputy (1990–1993).
John McVicar, 82, English robber and journalist, subject of the biopic McVicar, heart attack.
Ronald Pelton, 80, American intelligence analyst (NSA) and convicted spy.
Fahad Al Rajaan, 73, Kuwaiti banker and convicted embezzler.
Tina Ramirez, 92, Venezuelan-born American dancer and choreographer.
Philippe Ranaivomanana, 73, Malagasy Roman Catholic prelate, bishop of Ihosy (1999–2009) and Antsirabe (since 2009).
Donald E. Rosenblum, 93, American lieutenant general.
Magdalena Ruiz Guiñazú, 91, Argentine journalist and human rights activist.
Dan Schachte, 64, American ice hockey linesman (NHL).
Sydney Shoemaker, 90, American philosopher.
Earl J. Silbert, 86, American lawyer (Watergate scandal), aortic dissection.
Edo Spier, 96, Dutch architect and politician, senator (1991–1995).
Thẩm Thúy Hằng, 82, Vietnamese actress (The Beauty of Binh Duong, Four Oddballs of Saigon).
Hilda Žīgure, 104, Latvian stage actress.

7
David A. Arnold, 54, American comedian and television writer (Fuller House, The Rickey Smiley Show, That Girl Lay Lay).
Radoslav Brđanin, 74, Bosnian military officer and convicted war criminal.
James L. Fisher, 91, American academic administrator and psychologist.
János Fuzik, 64, Hungarian journalist and politician.
Anne Garrels, 71, American journalist (NPR, ABC News, NBC News), lung cancer.
Marsha Hunt, 104, American actress (Pride and Prejudice, Blossoms in the Dust, The Human Comedy).
Syed Amirul Islam, 86, Bangladeshi jurist, judge of the high court (1994–2007).
Børge Krogh, 80, Danish Olympic boxer (1960, 1964).
Willie Los'e, 55, New Zealand-born Tongan rugby union player (Auckland, North Harbour, Tonga national team) and broadcaster.
Lance Mackey, 52, American dog musher, four-time Iditarod champion (2007–2010) and Yukon Quest champion (2005–2008), throat cancer.
Ramchandra Manjhi, 97, Indian folk dancer.
Anatoliy Molotay, 84, Ukrainian football player (Lokomotyv Vinnytsia) and manager (Dnipro Cherkasy, Dynamo Irpin).
Valeri Polyakov, 80, Russian cosmonaut (Mir EO-3, Mir EO-4).
Rommy Hunt Revson, 78, American nightclub singer, inventor of the scrunchie, aortic rupture.
Mose Rison, 66, American football player and coach (Central Michigan Chippewas).
Dagmar Schipanski, 79, German physicist and politician, member and president of the Landtag of Thuringia (2004–2009).
Piet Schrijvers, 75, Dutch football player (Ajax, national team) and manager (TOP Oss), complications from Alzheimer's disease.
Bernard Shaw, 82, American journalist (CNN), pneumonia.
Alan Wilkins, 52, Scottish playwright.

8
Martin Barker, 76, British scholar.
Jens Birkemose, 79, Danish painter.
Bryan Harvey Bjarnason, 98, Canadian real estate agent and politician, Saskatchewan MLA (1964–1969).
Marciano Cantero, 62, Argentine singer (Enanitos Verdes).
Pinya Chuayplod, 82, Thai politician, MP (1979–1992), senator (2000–2006).
LaDeva Davis, 78, American television host and food educator.
Ľubomír Dobrík, 70, Slovak judge, member of the Constitutional Court of Slovakia (1997–2016).
Albert J. Dooley, 92, American politician, member of the South Carolina House of Representatives (1959–1964) and Senate (1971–1976).
Queen Elizabeth II, 96, British monarch and head of the Commonwealth (since 1952).
Randall B. Griepp, 82, American cardiothoracic surgeon.
A. Cecile J.W. Janssens, 54, Dutch epidemiologist, leukemia.
Bobby Keyes, 79, Australian rugby league player (Eastern Suburbs, Newtown).
Akbar Ali Khan, 78, Bangladeshi economist.
Anders Lönnbro, 76, Swedish actor (The Score, 1939, Tjenare kungen).
Eluki Monga Aundu, 81, Congolese military officer.
Mavis Nicholson, 91, Welsh writer and broadcaster.
Paulo Pitta e Cunha, 85, Portuguese lawyer, professor, and politician, deputy (1976–1980).
Gwyneth Powell, 76, English actress (Grange Hill, Man Down, The Guardians), complications from colon surgery.
Ted Schreiber, 84, American baseball player (New York Mets).
Yoel Schwartz, 82, Israeli Haredi rabbi.
Kamal Narain Singh, 95, Indian jurist, chief justice (1991) and chairman of the law commission (1991–1994).
Dave Smith, 88, Scottish football player (Burnley, Brighton & Hove Albion) and manager (Plymouth Argyle).
Susan L. Solomon, 71, American health activist and lawyer.
Bob Stacey, 72, American attorney.
Luke Swann, 39, English cricket coach (Northamptonshire).
Vadim Utkin, 84, Russian-American control theorist and electrical engineer.
Sonny West, 85, American songwriter ("Oh, Boy!", "Rave On") and musician.

9
Carol Arnauld, 61, French singer-songwriter.
Nicolae Bulat, 70, Moldovan historian, brain cancer.
Bryan Clark, 93, American actor (Don't Tell Mom the Babysitter's Dead, St. Elsewhere, Murphy Brown).
Jack Ging, 90, American actor (The A-Team, The Eleventh Hour, High Plains Drifter).
Shelby Jordan, 70, American football player (New England Patriots, Los Angeles Raiders).
Mark Miller, 97, American actor (Please Don't Eat the Daisies, Guestward, Ho!, Savannah Smiles).
Pierre Muller, 70, Swiss politician, mayor of Geneva (1999–2000, 2004–2005).
James Polshek, 92, American architect (Clinton Presidential Center, Brooklyn Museum).
Ray Rippelmeyer, 89, American baseball player (Washington Senators) and coach (Philadelphia Phillies).
Herschel Sizemore, 87, American bluegrass mandolinist.
Robert Hitchcock Spain, 96, American United Methodist bishop.
Clive Tanner, 88, British-born Canadian politician, British Columbia MLA (1991–1996).
Trevor Tomkins, 81, British jazz drummer (Gilgamesh).

10
Paulino Bernal, 83, American accordionist and Christian evangelist.
Menno Boelsma, 61, Dutch Olympic speed skater (1988).
Mario Bortolotto, 65, Australian footballer (Geelong, Carlton).
Frank Cignetti Sr., 84, American Hall of Fame college football coach (IUP Crimson Hawks, West Virginia Mountaineers).
Jorja Fleezanis, 70, American violinist.
Feargus Flood, 94, Irish judge.
Dick Gradley, 90, British Olympic gymnast (1960).
Eric Jones, 51, American comic book artist (Little Gloomy).
William Klein, 96, American-born French photographer, film director, and screenwriter (Who Are You, Polly Maggoo?, Mr. Freedom, The Model Couple).
B. B. Lal, 101, Indian archaeologist, director general of the ASI (1968–1972).
Maximilian Lerner, 98, Austrian-born American intelligence soldier (Ritchie Boys).
Bubba Monroe, 61, American professional wrestler.
Joseph Nacua, 77, Filipino Roman Catholic prelate, bishop of Ilagan (2008–2017).
Ilja Seifert, 71, German politician, MP (1990–1994, 1998–2002, 2005–2013).
Henri Stierlin, 94, Egyptian-born Swiss journalist and writer.
Choichi Terukina, 90, Japanese Ryukyuan musician.
Väinö Vilponiemi, 96, Finnish politician, MP (1962–1975).
Martin Wemyss, 94, English rear admiral.

11
Roger Bamber, 78, British photojournalist, lung cancer.
Jean Bock, 91, Belgian politician, senator (1995–1999) and mayor of Gouvy (1983–2004).
Muhammad Ali Chamseddine, 79, Lebanese writer and poet.
Syeda Sajeda Chowdhury, 87, Bangladeshi politician, MP (since 2008), complications from COVID-19.
Malcolm Erskine, 17th Earl of Buchan, 92, Scottish peer, member of the House of Lords (1984–1999).
David E. Grange Jr., 97, American military officer.
Joe Hart, 78, American politician, Arizona State Mine Inspector (2007–2021) and member of the Arizona House of Representatives (1992–2001).
Florin Hidișan, 40, Romanian footballer (Otopeni, UTA Arad, Pandurii Târgu Jiu), stomach cancer.
Ken Howard, 89, British artist, complications from a fall.
William D. Hyslop, 71, American attorney, US attorney for the Eastern District of Washington (1991–1993, 2019–2021).
Tadashi Kume, 91, Japanese businessman.
Harry Landis, 95, British actor (EastEnders, Friday Night Dinner, Bitter Victory) and stage director, cancer.
Kim Lenaghan, 61, Northern Irish journalist and radio presenter (BBC Radio Ulster).
Javier Marías, 70, Spanish novelist (A Heart So White, Tomorrow in the Battle Think on Me, Dark Back of Time), complications from pneumonia.
W. David McIntyre, 90, British-born New Zealand historian.
Sonia Handelman Meyer, 102, American photographer.
John W. O'Malley, 95, American historian and Jesuit priest.
Nelson Oñate, 79, Cuban Olympic sport shooter (1968).
Page Pate, 55, American attorney, drowned.
Donald Pigott, 94, British botanist.
Krishnam Raju, 82, Indian actor (Dharmaatmudu, Bobbili Brahmanna) and politician, MP (1998–2004), complications from COVID-19.
Roland Reber, 68, German film director (The Truth of Lie, 24/7: The Passion of Life) and author.
Joyce Reynolds, 103, British classicist and academic.
Swaroopanand Saraswati, 98, Indian religious leader, shankaracharya of Dwarka Sharada Peetham (since 1982), heart attack.
Roy Schmidt, 80, American football player (New Orleans Saints, Atlanta Falcons, Washington Redskins).
Alain Tanner, 92, Swiss film director (Charles, Dead or Alive, Jonah Who Will Be 25 in the Year 2000, In the White City) and screenwriter.
Elias Theodorou, 34, Canadian mixed martial artist, colon cancer.
Ahmet Toptaş, 73, Turkish politician, MP (2011–2015), lymphoma.
Gocha R. Tsetskhladze, 59, Soviet-born British archaeologist.
Anthony Varvaro, 37, American baseball player (Seattle Mariners, Atlanta Braves, Boston Red Sox), traffic collision.
Steven Zelditch, 68, American mathematician.

12
Harry Booth, 82, American college basketball and baseball coach (Saint Joseph's Hawks).
Ken Brownlee, 87, Scottish footballer (Aberdeen, Third Lanark, Boksburg), heart failure.
Radu Ciuceanu, 94, Romanian historian and politician, deputy (1990–1992, 2000–2004).
Michael DeGroote, 89, Belgian-born Canadian businessman and philanthropist.
Dennis East, 73, South African singer (Stingray), songwriter and record producer, stroke.
Vadim Filimonov, 91, Russian legal scholar and politician, deputy (1993–1999).
Jimmy Flynn, 88, American teamster and actor (Good Will Hunting, The Cider House Rules).
Efraín Forero Triviño, 92, Colombian road racing cyclist.
Britt Hildeng, 79, Norwegian politician, MP (1997–2009).
Ramsey Lewis, 87, American jazz pianist ("The 'In' Crowd"), composer and radio personality (WNUA), Grammy winner (1966, 1967, 1974).
Lowry Mays, 87, American mass media executive, co-founder of Clear Channel Communications.
Akio Miyazawa, 65, Japanese playwright, heart failure.
Ryuji Mizuno, 70, Japanese voice actor (Naruto, Berserk, Virtua Fighter), sepsis.
Eric Pianka, 83, American herpetologist and evolutionary ecologist.
PnB Rock, 30, American rapper ("Selfish"), shot.
Oleksandr Shapoval, 48, Ukrainian ballet dancer, shelling.
Rimantas Šidlauskas, 60, Lithuanian diplomat.
Henry Rupert Wilhoit Jr., 87, American lawyer, judge of the U.S. District Court for Eastern Kentucky (since 1981).
Shahpour Zarnegar, 93, Iranian Olympic fencer (1964).
Spiros Zournatzis, 86, Greek journalist and politician, MEP (1989).

13
Heiderose Berroth, 75, German politician, member of the Landtag of Baden-Württemberg (1996–2011).
Fred Callaghan, 77, English football player (Fulham) and manager (Woking, Brentford).
Jack Charles, 79, Australian actor (The Chant of Jimmie Blacksmith, Blackfellas, Tom White) and musician, stroke.
Bertha Espinoza Segura, 64, Mexican politician, deputy (since 2018), cancer.
Sarah Ferguson, 80, Jersey politician.
Fred Franzia, 79, American winemaker (Bronco Wine Company).
Jean-Luc Godard, 91, French-Swiss film director (Breathless, Bande à part, Pierrot le Fou), screenwriter and critic, assisted suicide.
Brian Hewson, 89, English Olympic middle-distance runner (1956, 1960).
N. M. Joseph, 78, Indian politician, Kerala MLA (1987–1991).
Theophilos Kamberidis, 92, Greek politician, MP (1964–1967) and mayor of Katerini (1987–1990).
Kostas Kazakos, 87, Greek actor (Act of Reprisal, Bullets don't come back, The Man with the Carnation).
Tessa Keswick, 79, British policy analyst.
Kornelije Kovač, 80, Serbian composer and musician (Korni Grupa, Indexi).
Werner Loewe, 81, German politician, member of the Hamburg Parliament (1978–1986).
Roxanne Lowit, 80, American fashion photographer.
Don Marquis, 86, American philosopher.
Grzegorz Matuszak, 81, Polish sociologist and politician, senator (2001–2005).
Abderrahmane Mehdaoui, 72, Algerian footballer (WA Tlemcen, DRB Tadjenanet, national team).
Joe Patton, 50, American football player (Washington Redskins).
Jesse Powell, 51, American R&B singer ("All I Need", "I Wasn't with It", "You"), cardiac arrest.
Jim Russell, 76, American journalist and radio producer, complications from a fall.
Faisal Saif, 46, Indian film director (Jigyaasa, Main Hoon Part-Time Killer, Paanch Ghantey Mien Paanch Crore), multiple organ failure.
Ken Starr, 76, American lawyer (Whitewater controversy), judge of the U.S. Court of Appeals for the D.C. Circuit (1983–1989) and solicitor general (1989–1993), complications from surgery.
Suh Dae-sook, 90, North Korean biographer.
Toshiko Taira, 101, Japanese textile artist.
Fletcher Thompson, 97, American lawyer and politician, member of the U.S. House of Representatives (1967–1973) and Georgia Senate (1965–1967).
Pierre Tournier, 88, French football player (SO Montpellier, FC Rouen) and manager (US Saint-Malo).
Gabrielle Upton, 101, Canadian-born American screenwriter (Gidget, The Loretta Young Show, The Virginian) and actress.

14
Horacio Accavallo, 87, Argentine boxer, WBA and WBC flyweight champion (1966–1968).
Aram Bakshian, 78, American political aide and speechwriter, White House director of speechwriting (1981–1983).
Jack Brogan, 92, American art fabricator.
Cal Browning, 84, American baseball player (St. Louis Cardinals).
Kevin M. Cahill, 86, American physician.
Géza Csapó, 71, Hungarian canoeist, Olympic silver medallist (1976).
Ken Douglas, 86, New Zealand trade unionist, president of the NZCTU (1987–1999).
Anton Fier, 66, American drummer (The Feelies, The Golden Palominos, Bob Mould), composer and producer, assisted suicide.
Bengt Gingsjö, 70, Swedish Olympic swimmer (1972, 1976).
Shah Moazzem Hossain, 83, Bangladeshi politician, MP (1991–1995).
Lothar Hübner, 66, German politician, member of the Landtag of Bavaria (1994).
Naresh Kumar, 93, Indian tennis player.
Li Qiwan, 86–87, Chinese politician, member of the National People's Congress (1983–1988).
Robert P. Maginnis, 88, American Roman Catholic prelate, auxiliary bishop of Philadelphia (1996–2010).
Louis-Michel Nourry, 76, French historian.
Mariano Ondo, 23, Equatoguinean footballer (Cano Sport, Shkupi, national team), cardiac arrest.
Dimitrios Pandermalis, 82, Greek archaeologist and curator (Acropolis Museum).
Irene Papas, 93, Greek actress (Zorba the Greek, The Guns of Navarone, Z) and singer, complications from Alzheimer's disease.
Park Byeong-yun, 81, South Korean politician, member of the National Assembly (2000–2004).
Bill Pearl, 91, American bodybuilder.
Rubén Placanica, 79, Argentine Olympic cyclist (1964), COVID-19.
Jim Post, 82, American singer (Friend & Lover) and songwriter ("Reach Out of the Darkness").
Jeff Pyle, 58, American politician, member of the Pennsylvania House of Representatives (2005–2021), kidney cancer.
Andy Romano, 86, American actor (Under Siege, Major League, Hill Street Blues).
Yadollah Royaee, 90, Iranian poet.
Paul Sartin, 51, English folk singer, musician (Bellowhead, Faustus, Belshazzar's Feast) and composer.
Henry Silva, 95, American actor (Ocean's 11, The Manchurian Candidate, Ghost Dog: The Way of the Samurai).
Vladimir Sungorkin, 68, Russian journalist and media manager.
P. S. Thiruvengadam, 87, Indian politician, Tamil Nadu MLA (1977–1984, 1987–1991, 1996–2001).
Michel Verschueren, 91, Belgian businessman and sporting director, manager of R.S.C. Anderlecht (1981–2003).
Arnold Vitarbo, 86, American Olympic sport shooter (1968).
David Wakefield, 86, English rugby league player (Wakefield Trinity, Doncaster).
Mária Wittner, 85, Hungarian revolutionary and politician, MP (2006–2014).
Zhang Chuanmiao, 85, Chinese military officer and politician, member of the National People's Congress (1993–1998).

15
Brian Binnie, 69, American commercial astronaut (SpaceShipOne flight 17P).
Eddie Butler, 65, Welsh rugby union player (British & Irish Lions, Barbarian F.C., national team), commentator and journalist.
Gopanarayan Das, 74, Indian advocate and politician, MLA, cardiac arrest.
Françoise Dupuy, 97, French dancer and choreographer.
Jörg Faerber, 93, German conductor (Württemberg Chamber Orchestra Heilbronn).
Robert Ferrante, 87, American news producer.
Tibor Frank, 74, Hungarian historian, member of the Hungarian Academy of Sciences.
Liam Holden, 68, Northern Irish victim of a miscarriage of justice.
Sam Howe, 84, American squash player, complications from an infection.
Axel Jodorowsky, 57, Mexican-French actor (Santa Sangre, The Dance of Reality).
Thomas Jung, 64, German lawyer and politician, member of the Landtag of Brandenburg (2014–2019).
Saul Kripke, 81, American philosopher and logician.
Earle Labor, 94, American literary scholar.
Diana Maggi, 97, Italian-born Argentine actress (Frontera Sur, The Bohemian Soul, Campeón a la fuerza).
Francescantonio Nolè, 74, Italian Roman Catholic prelate, bishop of Tursi-Lagonegro (2000–2015) and archbishop of Cosenza-Bisignano (since 2015).
Maanu Paul, 83, New Zealand Māori leader.
Fritz Pleitgen, 84, German journalist and author, director of WDR (1995–2007), president of the German Cancer Aid (2011–2021) and head of the EBU (2006–2008), pancreatic cancer.
Radko Polič, 80, Slovenian actor (The Widowhood of Karolina Žašler, Balkan Express, Silent Gunpowder).
Asad Rauf, 66, Pakistani cricket player (National Bank of Pakistan, Lahore) and umpire, cardiac arrest.
Jeanne Renaud, 94, Canadian choreographer.
Mykhailo Rodionov, 85, Ukrainian politician, people's deputy (2002–2006).
Alois Roppert, 88, Austrian politician, MP (1979–1994).
Anatoliy Smirnov, 80, Russian politician.
John Stearns, 71, American baseball player and coach (New York Mets), cancer.
Svend Studsgaard, 75, Danish Olympic wrestler (1980).
Samy Vellu, 86, Malaysian politician, minister of works (1979–1989, 1995–2008) and MP (1974–2008).
Dennis Virkler, 80, American film editor (The Fugitive, The Hunt for Red October, Batman Forever), heart failure.

16
Heinz Allenspach, 94, Swiss politician, MP (1979–1995).
Mahsa Amini, 22, Iranian woman, subject of the Mahsa Amini protests.
Allen Aylett, 88, Australian football player (North Melbourne) and administrator.
Mark Bloch, 98, Russian linguist.
Ronald Cohn, 78, American zoologist.
Sergei Gorenko, 40, Russian politician and public prosecutor, explosion.
Abul Hasnat, 82, Bangladeshi lawyer and politician, MP (1990), twice minister of housing, mayor of Dhaka (1977–1982, 1990).
Marva Hicks, 66, American singer and actress (Mad About You, One Life to Live, Star Trek: Voyager).
Amedeo Matacena, 59, Italian shipowner, mobster and politician, deputy (1994–2001), heart attack.
Mark Nykanen, 70, American novelist and journalist.
James Aubrey Parker, 85, American lawyer, judge of the U.S. District Court for the District of New Mexico (since 1987).
Haluk Pekşen, 61, Turkish lawyer and politician, MP (2015–2018).
Raymundo Taco Sabio, 76, Filipino Roman Catholic priest, prefect of the Marshall Islands (2007–2017) and member of the Missionaries of the Sacred Heart (since 1969).
Hajrudin Saračević, 73, Bosnian football player (Željezničar) and manager (Bačka 1901).
Luciano Vassallo, 87, Ethiopian football player (Asmara Calcio, national team) and manager (Cotton Factory Club).
Stanisław Żytkowski, 74, Polish lawyer and politician, senator (1989–1991).

17
Nicolas Belfrage, 82, American-born British wine critic and writer, complications of Parkinson's disease.
Meinhard Doelle, 68, German-born Canadian lawyer.
Lydia Dotto, 72–73, Canadian science journalist and author.
Jim Frazier, 81, Australian inventor (Frazier lens) and cinematographer.
José García Buitrón, 77, Spanish doctor and politician, senator (2015–2016).
Mathias Feldges, 85, Swiss politician, member of the Executive Council of Basel-Stadt (1984–1997).
Robert Gentry, 81, American actor (Generations, All My Children, Another World).
Joseph P. Hoar, 87, American Marine Corps general.
Manikrao Hodlya Gavit, 87, Indian politician, MP (1980–2014).
Kelsang Gyatso, 91, Tibetan Buddhist monk and meditation teacher, founder of New Kadampa Tradition.
Michael Homan, 56, American theologian and musician, cirrhosis.
Isami Ishii, 80, Japanese manga artist (750 Rider), heart failure.
Hrafn Jökulsson, 56, Icelandic writer, journalist (Tíminn, Alþýðublaðið) and politician, MP (1995–1999), cancer.
Jeremy Kilpatrick, 86, American mathematician, complications from Parkinson's disease.
Mal Logan, 91, Australian geographer and university administrator, vice-chancellor and president of Monash University (1987–1996).
Igor Maslennikov, 90, Russian film director (Sentimental Romance, The Adventures of Sherlock Holmes and Dr. Watson, Winter Cherry).
Vlado Milunić, 81, Yugoslav-born Czech architect (Dancing House).
Phil Mulkey, 89, American Olympic decathlete (1960).
Art Noonan, 70, American politician, member of the Montana House of Representatives (2004–2009), heart attack.
Maria Grazia Pagano, 76, Italian politician, senator (1992–2006), MEP (2008–2009).
Christian Rätsch, 65, German anthropologist.
Maarten Schmidt, 92, Dutch-born American astronomer (Kennicutt–Schmidt law), discoverer of the quasar.
Anna Thynn, Marchioness of Bath, 78, Hungarian-born British actress (Therese and Isabelle, The House of the Missing Girls, Zeta One).

18
Azyumardi Azra, 67, Indonesian Islamic scholar, rector of Syarif Hidayatullah State Islamic University Jakarta (1998–2006).
Leonard A. Cole, 89, American dentist and political scientist.
Mustafa Dağıstanlı, 91, Turkish freestyle wrestler, Olympic champion (1956, 1960).
Vincent Di Maio, 81, American pathologist, complications from COVID-19.
Kjell Espmark, 92, Swedish writer, member of the Swedish Academy (since 1981).
Yakov Gorelnikov, 74, Kazakh actor and politician, deputy (1994–1995).
Diane Guérin, 74, Canadian singer and actress (Sol et Gobelet).
Elyakim Haetzni, 96, German-born Israeli lawyer, settlement activist and politician, MK (1988–1992).
Nick Holonyak, 93, American engineer and inventor.
Huang Nianlai, 82, Chinese mycologist and politician, member of the National People's Congress (1983–1993).
Martha Karagianni, 82, Greek actress (Something Is Burning, Kiss the Girls, Marijuana Stop!).
Svetozar Saša Kovačević, 72, Serbian composer, music pedagogue and church organist.
Nathan Larson, 41, American politician, suicide by starvation.
Albert Legault, 84, Canadian academic and researcher.
Gabriella Licudi, 81, British actress (Casino Royale).
Carmen A. Miró, 103, Panamanian sociologist, statistician, and demographer.
Héctor Polino, 89, Argentine lawyer and politician, deputy (1993–2005).
Mary Russell, 88, Scottish socialite.
Nicolas Schindelholz, 34, Swiss footballer (Thun, Aarau, Luzern), lung cancer.
Wally Tatomir, 76, Canadian-born American ice hockey equipment manager (Carolina Hurricanes) and inventor.
Cherry Valentine, 28, English drag queen (RuPaul's Drag Race UK, Cherry Valentine: Gypsy Queen and Proud), suicide.
Jeff Weiss, 82, American actor (Vanilla Sky, Mr. Destiny) and playwright.
Christopher Ziadie, 55, Jamaican footballer (Boys' Town, national team).

19
Klaus Behrens, 81, German rower, Olympic silver medallist (1964).
Robert Brown, 95, American actor (Here Come the Brides, Primus, The Flame Barrier).
Lija Brīdaka, 90, Latvian poet.
Vernon Dvorak, 93, American meteorologist.
Joseph Fiorenza, 91, American Roman Catholic prelate, bishop of San Angelo (1979–1984), bishop (1985–2004) and archbishop (2004–2006) of Galveston–Houston.
David Foreman, 74, American environmentalist, co-founder of Earth First!.
Vladimir Golubev, 72, Russian football player (Zenit, Soviet Union national team) and manager.
John, 87, Canadian Orthodox prelate, metropolitan primate of the UOCC (2005–2010).
Marilyn P. Johnson, 100, American diplomat, ambassador to Togo (1978–1981).
Harry Langford, 92, Canadian football player (Calgary Stampeders).
Herb Lusk, 69, American football player (Philadelphia Eagles) and pastor.
Shabsa Mashkautsan, 98, Romanian-born soldier, Hero of the Soviet Union (1945).
Valerie Maynard, 85, American sculptor.
Susan Menard, American politician, mayor of Woonsocket, Rhode Island (1995–2009), chronic obstructive pulmonary disease. (body discovered on this date)
Jaakko Numminen, 93, Finnish politician, minister of education (1970).
Pak Yong-il, 56, North Korean politician, vice-chairman of the standing committee of the SPA (since 2019).
Julien Rascagnères, 77, French rugby league player (XIII Catalan, Pia) and international referee.
Bishnu Sethi, 61, Indian writer and politician, Odisha MLA (2000–2004), kidney disease.
Maury Wills, 89, American baseball player (Los Angeles Dodgers, Pittsburgh Pirates) and manager (Seattle Mariners), World Series champion (1959, 1963, 1965).

20
Émile Antonio, 94, French footballer (FC Sète, OGC Nice, Olympique Lyonnais).
Choi U-geun, 96, South Korean businessman and politician, MNA (1976–1980).
Ian Hay Davison, 91, British businessman.
Philippine Dhanis, 55, Belgian politician and parliamentary assistant.
David C. Harrington, 68, American politician, member of the Maryland Senate (2008–2011) and mayor of Bladensburg (1995–2002).
Robert Kalfin, 89, American stage director and producer.
Tanios El Khoury, 92, Lebanese Maronite Catholic prelate, eparch of Sidon (1996–2005).
John Marks, 97, British medical doctor, chairman of the British Medical Association (1984–1990).
Aleksey Nagin, 41, Russian military officer.
Sergei Puskepalis, 56, Russian actor (Metro, How I Ended This Summer, Simple Things) and theatre director, traffic collision.
Virginio Rognoni, 98, Italian politician, minister of the interior (1978–1983), justice (1986–1987) and defence (1990–1992).
Nika Shakarami, 16, Iranian protester (Mahsa Amini protests).
Song Baorui, 84, Chinese politician, governor of Sichuan (1996–1999).
Charles Stack, 86, American lawyer.
Peter Yeldham, 95, Australian screenwriter (Ten Little Indians, The Call of the Wild), playwright (Seven Little Australians) and novelist.

21
Mohd Adib Mohamad Adam, 81, Malaysian politician, chief minister of Malacca (1978–1982) and MP (1982–1990).
Lydia Alfonsi, 94, Italian actress (Black Sabbath, The Strange Night, Open Doors).
Tom Benner, 72, Canadian sculptor and painter.
Roland Bulirsch, 89, German mathematician (Bulirsch–Stoer algorithm).
Dean Caswell, 100, American World War II flying ace.
Antonio Ceballos Atienza, 87, Spanish Roman Catholic prelate, bishop of Ciudad Rodrigo (1988–1993) and Cádiz y Ceuta (1993–2011), stroke.
François Corteggiani, 69, French comics artist (Pif le chien, Pif Gadget).
Andy Detwiler, 52, American farmer and internet personality.
John Duncan, 84, American author and historian.
Ray Edenton, 95, American guitarist and session musician.
Bernhardt Edskes, 81, Dutch-Swiss organ builder.
Jimmy Elder, 94, Scottish footballer (Portsmouth, Colchester United, Yeovil Town).
Anatoly Gerashchenko, 72, Russian aviation scientist and academic, rector of the Moscow Aviation Institute (2007–2015), fall.
Makhluf Haddadin, 86–87, Jordanian chemist.
John Hamblin, 87, English-born Australian television presenter (Play School) and actor (The Restless Years).
Raymond Huguet, 84, French racing cyclist.
Charles Kadushin, 90, American psychologist.
Earl Killian, 102, American sports coach (Towson Tigers).
Greg Lee, 70, American basketball player (UCLA Bruins, Portland Trail Blazers) and beach volleyball player, infection.
Andrea Molnár-Bodó, 88, Hungarian gymnast, Olympic champion (1956).
Edward Mosberg, 96, Polish-American Holocaust survivor.
Darrell Mudra, 93, American Hall of Fame college football coach (North Dakota State Bison, Arizona Wildcats, Eastern Illinois Panthers).
Sedapatti Muthiah, 76, Indian politician, twice MP, member (1977–1989) and speaker (1991–1996) of the Tamil Nadu Legislative Assembly.
Sirkka Norrlund, 79, Finnish Olympic hurdler (1964).
Paul-Emile Saadé, 89, Lebanese Maronite Catholic prelate, auxiliary bishop of Antioch (1986–1999) and eparch of Batroun (1999–2011).
Isidro Sala, 81, Spanish Olympic footballer (1968).
Allan M. Siegal, 82, American newspaper editor (The New York Times).
Raju Srivastav, 58, Indian actor (Bombay to Goa, Aamdani Atthanni Kharcha Rupaiya) and comedian (The Great Indian Laughter Challenge), complications from a heart attack.
Kapil Narayan Tiwari, 93, Indian activist and politician, MLA (1977–1980).
Tu Zhen, 88, Chinese translator.
Russell Weir, 71, Scottish golfer.
Tomasz Wołek, 74, Polish journalist and sports commentator.

22
Stu Allan, 60, British dance music DJ (Clock) and record producer, stomach cancer.
István Aranyos, 80, Hungarian Olympic gymnast (1964, 1968).
Dave Barrow, 75, Canadian politician, mayor of Richmond Hill (2006–2021).
Dmitriy Besov, 98, Russian football coach.
Donald M. Blinken, 96, American diplomat, ambassador to Hungary (1994–1997).
François Bott, 87, French novelist and journalist, founder of Le Nouveau Magazine Littéraire.
Tony Brown, 77, English darts player.
Stephen Chazen, 76, American energy executive, CEO of Occidental Petroleum (2011–2016), cancer.
Marc Danval, 85, Belgian journalist and writer.
Ioannis Dimopoulos, 90, Greek politician, MP (1974–1981), MEP (1981).
Jorge Fons, 83, Mexican film director (Los Cachorros, Fé, Esperanza y Caridad, The Bricklayers).
Igor Gorbunov, 81, Russian politician.
Tim Hankinson, 67, American soccer coach (Oglethorpe University, Indy Eleven, Chattanooga Red Wolves).
Raymond Jones, 97, Australian architect and footballer (Collingwood, Melbourne).
Rainer Keller, 56, German politician, MP (since 2021).
Humayun Khan, 90, Pakistani diplomat and politician, foreign secretary (1988–1989).
Wendell Lady, 91, American politician, member (1969–1983) and speaker (1979–1983) of the Kansas House of Representatives.
Dame Hilary Mantel, 70, British author (Wolf Hall, Bring Up the Bodies, The Mirror & the Light), Booker Prize winner (2009, 2012), complications from a stroke.
Robert Marlow, 60, English singer ("The Face of Dorian Gray").
Nick Mumley, 85, American football player (New York Titans).
Pal Singh Purewal, 90, Indian-Canadian scholar (Nanakshahi calendar).
Katharine Lee Reid, 90, American art historian and museum director, complications following heart surgery.
Ren Rongrong, 99, Chinese children's author and translator.
Ronald V. Schmidt, 78, American computer network engineer, co-founder of SynOptics.
Hesham Selim, 64, Egyptian actor, cancer.
Mohamed Sheikh, Baron Sheikh, 81, British businessman and peer, member of the House of Lords (since 2006).
Ladislav Švihran, 90, Belgian-born Slovak writer and translator.
Wang Wei, 48, Chinese politician, member of the National People's Congress (since 2018).

23
Prince Amartey, 78, Ghanaian boxer, Olympic bronze medallist (1972).
Carlos Balá, 97, Argentine actor (My Family's Beautiful!) and comedian, heart failure.
James R. Biard, 91, American electrical engineer and inventor.
Jamie Brannen, 47, Canadian curler.
Marut Bunnag, 98, Thai politician, speaker of the House of Representatives (1992–1995).
Boris Dobrodeev, 95, Russian screenwriter (The First Teacher, Particularly Important Task, Recollections of Pavlovsk).
Zack Estrin, 51, American television writer and producer (Prison Break, Charmed, Lost in Space).
Louise Fletcher, 88, American actress (One Flew Over the Cuckoo's Nest, Star Trek: Deep Space Nine, Brainstorm), Oscar winner (1976).
Giuliano Fortunato, 82, Italian footballer (Triestina, Milan, Lazio).
Bill Fulcher, 88, American football player (Washington Redskins) and coach (Georgia Tech Yellow Jackets, Tampa Spartans).
Heather Goodman, 87, English Olympic canoer (1972).
Vladimir Krasnopolskiy, 89, Russian film director (The Slowest Train, Not Under the Jurisdiction, Eternal Call), screenwriter and producer.
Imre Koltai, 84, Hungarian chemical engineer and politician, MP (1980–1990, 1994–1998).
Vladimir Petercă, 78, Romanian Roman Catholic theologian.
Franciszek Pieczka, 94, Polish actor (Four Tank-Men and a Dog, The Deluge, Quo Vadis).
Celso Scarpini, 77, Brazilian Olympic basketball player (1968).
Jim Sheridan, 69, British politician, MP (2001–2015).
Willy Soemita, 86, Surinamese politician, deputy vice president (1988–1990).
Starman, 47, Mexican professional wrestler (CMLL).

24
Hudson Austin, 84, Grenadian military officer, chairman of the Revolutionary Military Council (1983).
Tim Ball, 83, British-born Canadian climatologist and public speaker.
Bill Blaikie, 71, Canadian politician, MP (1979–2008) and Manitoba MLA (2009–2011), cancer.
Andon Boshkovski, 47, Macedonian handball coach (HC Rabotnichki, RK Eurofarm Rabotnik, Georgia national team).
Chic Brodie, 78, Scottish politician, MSP (2011–2016), oesophageal cancer.
Chris Davidson, 45, Australian surfer, head injury.
Chandler Davis, 96, American-Canadian mathematician.
Manfred Degen, 82, German politician, member of the Landtag of North Rhine-Westphalia (1990–2005).
Marie-Louise Fort, 71, French politician, deputy (2007–2017), mayor of Sens (2001–2008, since 2014).
Rita Gardner, 87, American actress (A Family Affair, The Wedding Singer, Little Voice), leukemia.
Simon Ibo, 82, French actor, singer, and politician, member of the Regional Council of Guadeloupe (1998–2003).
Sue Mingus, 92, American record producer and music manager.
Kitten Natividad, 74, Mexican-American actress (Beneath the Valley of the Ultra-Vixens, Night Patrol, Takin' It All Off) and exotic dancer.
Pavel Pervushin, 75, Russian heavyweight weightlifter, 110kg world champion (1973).
Stephen Pruslin, 82, American pianist and librettist. 
John Rowe, 77, American attorney and energy executive (Exelon).
Pharoah Sanders, 81, American jazz saxophonist.
Amin Tarokh, 69, Iranian actor (Mother, Sara, Aghazadeh), heart disease.
Fiorenzo Toso, 60, Italian academic and linguist, brain tumor.
Sam Webb, 85, British architect.
Helmut Wilhelm, 76, German judge and politician, MP (1994–2002).

25
Ashokan, 60, Indian film director (Varnam, Saandram, Mookilla Rajyathu).
Jonathan Beaulieu-Richard, 33, Canadian football player (Montreal Alouettes, Ottawa Redblacks), cancer.
Aïcha Chenna, 81, Moroccan social worker and women's rights activist, founder of Association Solidarité Féminine.
Rafael Chimishkyan, 93, Georgian weightlifter, Olympic champion (1952).
Gürkan Coşkun, 81, Turkish painter, cancer.
Jacques Drèze, 93, Belgian economist.
Elena Elagina, 73, Russian conceptual artist.
James Florio, 85, American politician, governor of New Jersey (1990–1994) and member of the U.S. House of Representatives (1975–1990).
Josef Gitelson, 94, Russian biophysicist.
Masaaki Ikenaga, 76, Japanese baseball player (Nishitetsu Lions), cancer.
Melvin Kaplan, 93, American oboist.
Kim Seong-Dong, 74, South Korean writer.
Nikolai Kirtok, 101, Ukrainian-born Russian Red Army pilot, Hero of the Soviet Union (1945).
Roy MacLaren, 92, Scottish footballer (St Johnstone, Sheffield Wednesday, Bury).
Angus McKenzie, 86, British Olympic fencer (1960).
Aryadan Muhammed, 87, Indian politician, Kerala MLA (1977–2016).
Andrés Prieto, 93, Chilean football player (Universidad Católica, national team) and manager (Colo-Colo).
Radovan Radaković, 51, Serbian football manager and player (Tilleur-Liégeois, Partizan, FR Yugoslavia national team).
Aníbal Ramón Ruffner, 63, Peruvian engineer and politician, mayor of San Buenaventura District, Canta (2003–2010).
Gianfranco Spadaccia, 87, Italian politician, deputy (1983–1986, 1990) and senator (1987–1990).
Prema Srinivasan, 90, Indian children's author.
Robert Steckle, 92, Canadian Olympic wrestler (1952, 1956, 1960).
Leslie Denis Swindale, 94, New Zealand-born American soil scientist.
Meredith Tax, 80, American writer and political activist.
Jean-René Toumelin, 80, French sporting director, president of FC Nantes (1996–1999).
Srbijanka Turajlić, 76, Serbian academic and political activist.
Igor Varlamov, 51, Russian footballer (Torpedo Vladimir, Tyumen, Spartak Nalchik).
Sandra Zaiter, 78, Dominican-Puerto Rican actress, children's television show host (Teatrimundo) and singer.
Oleksiy Zhuravko, 48, Ukrainian-Russian politician, people's deputy (2006–2012), airstrike.

26
Tony L. Bennett, 82, American police officer and politician, member of the Minnesota House of Representatives (1971–1974, 1983–1990).
Igor Bezoglyuk, 50, Ukrainian military serviceman, mine detonation.
Joe Bussard, 86, American record collector, pancreatic cancer.
Brian Catling, 73, British sculptor, writer (The Vorrh, The Erstwhile) and filmmaker.
Meiny Epema-Brugman, 91, Dutch politician, MP (1970–1971, 1972–1982).
Cole Harris, 86, Canadian geographer and academic.
Hugh Hyland, 72, Irish Gaelic footballer (Monasterevin, Kildare).
Frederick Kriekenbeek, 90, Filipino Roman Catholic priest and exorcist.
Lilo, 101, German-born French singer and actress (La bonne année, And Now My Love).
Ranesh Maitra, 88, Bangladeshi journalist.
Hilaree Nelson, 49, American ski mountaineer, avalanche.
Carlos Pairetti, 86, Argentine stock car racing driver, lung failure.
Ronney Pettersson, 82, Swedish footballer (Djurgårdens IF, Hudiksvalls ABK, national team).
Michel Pinçon, 80, French sociologist, Alzheimer's disease.
William Rivers Pitt, 50, American author.
Cristien Polak, 68, Surinamese politician.
Yusuf al-Qaradawi, 96, Egyptian Islamic scholar (The Lawful and the Prohibited in Islam), chairman of IUMS (since 2004).
Tom Reed, 77, American college football player and coach (Miami University Redskins, North Carolina State Wolfpack).
Dave Smith, 74, English footballer (Lincoln City, Rotherham United). (death announced on this date)
Knud Sørensen, 94, Danish novelist, essayist, and poet.
Mark Souder, 72, American politician, member of the U.S. House of Representatives (1995–2010), pancreatic cancer.
Venetia Stevenson, 84, English-American actress (Day of the Outlaw, Seven Ways from Sundown, The Sergeant Was a Lady), complications from Parkinson's disease.
Paolo Tringali, 97, Italian politician, deputy (1983–1987).
Wong Phui Nam, 87, Malaysian economist and poet.

27
Madingo Afework, 44, Ethiopian tizita singer.
Amadou Ali, 79, Cameroonian politician, minister of justice (2001–2011).
Michio Ariyoshi, 87, Japanese shogi player, aspiration pneumonia.
Andrew van der Bijl, 94, Dutch Christian missionary, founder of Open Doors.
Kurt Binder, 78, Austrian theoretical physicist.
Bruno Bolchi, 82, Italian football player (Inter, national team) and manager (Lecce).
Vincent Deporter, 63, Belgian comic book artist and animator (SpongeBob Comics).
Shinjirō Ehara, 85, Japanese actor (Jun'ai Monogatari, The Rice People, Naked Sun), progressive supranuclear palsy.
Prince Ferfried of Hohenzollern, 79, German aristocrat and racing driver.
Julio César Guerra Tulena, 89, Colombian surgeon and politician, deputy (1991–1994), member (1994–2002) and president of the Senate (1995–1996).
Jean-Claude Hiquet, 82, French rugby union player (SU Agen, national team).
Joan Hotchkis, 95, American actress (The Life and Times of Eddie Roberts, The Odd Couple, My World and Welcome to It), heart failure.
Ronald W. Jones, 91, American trade economist.
Claude Kory Kondiano, 79–80, Guinean politician, president of the National Assembly (2014–2020).
Boris Moiseev, 68, Russian pop singer, choreographer and dancer, stroke.
José Pacheco, 75, Spanish footballer (Atlético Madrid, Logroñés).
Judah Samet, 84, Hungarian-American Holocaust survivor, public speaker and businessman, stomach cancer.
Michael John Sheridan, 77, American Roman Catholic prelate, auxiliary bishop of St. Louis (1997–2001), coadjutor bishop (2001–2003) and bishop (2003–2021) of Colorado Springs.

28
Mario Algaze, 75, Cuban-American photographer.
Michel Ameller, 96, French government official, member of the Constitutional Council (1995–2004).
João de Aquino, 77, Brazilian guitarrist and composer.
Arlene Bashnett, 103, American internet celebrity (Gramma and Ginga).
Torhild Bransdal, 66, Norwegian politician, MP (2017–2021) and mayor of Vennesla (1999–2017).
Coolio, 59, American rapper ("Gangsta's Paradise", "Fantastic Voyage", "C U When U Get There") and actor, Grammy winner (1996), cardiac arrest.
Stephanie Dabney, 64, American prima ballerina, cardiopulmonary arrest.
Hilton Deakin, 89, Australian Roman Catholic prelate, auxiliary bishop of Melbourne (1993–2007).
Gavin Escobar, 31, American football player (Dallas Cowboys), rock climbing accident.
David Gottesman, 96, American businessman, founder of First Manhattan Co.
David Warner Hagen, 90, American jurist, judge of the U.S. District Court of Nevada (1993–2005).
Amar Singh Mangat, 87, Kenyan Olympic field hockey player (1964).
Jim Nisbet, 75, American author and poet.
Julio Osorio, 82, Panamanian Olympic basketball player (1968).
Jayanti Patnaik, 90, Indian social worker and politician, MP (1980–1989, 1998–1999) and chairperson of the NCW (1992–1995).
Andre Payette, 46, Canadian ice hockey player (Philadelphia Phantoms, Newcastle Vipers, Sheffield Steeldogs).
Bill Plante, 84, American journalist (CBS News).
Oonah Shannahan, 101, New Zealand netball player (national team).
Jan Styrna, 81, Polish Roman Catholic prelate, auxiliary bishop of Tarnów (1991–2003) and bishop of Elbląg (2003–2014).
Masayoshi Takemura, 88, Japanese politician, MP (1986–2000), minister of finance (1994–1996) and chief cabinet secretary (1993–1994).
Tom Urbani, 54, American baseball player (St. Louis Cardinals, Detroit Tigers).

29
Alexandru Arșinel, 83, Romanian actor (Colierul de turcoaze, Everybody in Our Family).
Egil Bjerklund, 89, Norwegian Olympic ice hockey player (1952, 1964).
Gilles Boisvert, 89, Canadian ice hockey player (Detroit Red Wings).
Kathleen Booth, 100, English computer scientist and mathematician.
C. B. Embry, 81, American politician, member of the Kentucky House of Representatives (2003–2015) and Senate (2015–2022), cancer.
Audrey Evans, 97, British-born American oncologist and philanthropist, co-founder of Ronald McDonald House Charities.
Andrée Ferretti, 87, Canadian Quebec independence activist and author.
Mieczysław Gil, 78, Polish politician, MP (1989–1993) and senator (2011–2015).
Sohan Hayreh, 94–95, Indian-born American ophthalmologist.
Akissi Kouamé, 67, Ivorian army officer.
Rob Landsbergen, 62, Dutch footballer (PSV Eindhoven, Hyundai Horangi), complications from Alzheimer's disease.
Gilles Loiselle, 93, Canadian politician, MP (1988–1993) and minister of finance (1993).
Héctor López, 93, Panamanian baseball player (New York Yankees, Kansas City Athletics), World Series champion (1961, 1962).
David Malachowski, 67, American guitarist, producer and composer.
Yousuf Mustikhan, 74, Pakistani politician, liver cancer.
Eduardo Navarro, 43, Spanish footballer (Lleida, Huesca, Numancia).
Marybeth Peters, 83, American attorney, register of copyrights (1994–2010).
Al Primo, 87, American television news executive.
Prins Póló, 45, Icelandic singer-songwriter, cancer.
Ignacio Rodríguez Iturbe, 80, Venezuelan hydrologist.
Ildikó Szendrődi-Kővári, 92, Hungarian Olympic alpine skier (1952, 1964).
Paul Veyne, 92, French archaeologist and historian.
Sylvia Wu, 106, Chinese-born American restauranteur.

30
Richard Akuoko Adiyiah, 67, Ghanaian politician, MP (2008–2012).
Shehzad Azam, 36, Pakistani cricketer (Islamabad).
Manvel Badeyan, 65, Armenian politician, MP (1999–2003).
Max Baer, 74, American jurist, chief justice of the Supreme Court of Pennsylvania (since 2021).
Bill Basford, 92, American politician, member of the Florida House of Representatives (1963–1966).
Jean-Louis Bauer, 70, French actor and playwright.
Charles Bowsher, 91, American politician, comptroller general (1981–1996).
Marit Christensen, 73, Norwegian journalist (NRK).
Bartolomé Clavero, 75, Spanish jurist, legal historian and academic.
Franco Dragone, 69, Italian-born Belgian theatre director, founder of Dragone, heart attack.
San'yūtei Enraku VI, 72, Japanese rakugo comedian (Shōten), lung cancer.
Hildred Geertz, 95, American anthropologist.
Zahos Hadjifotiou, 99, Greek businessman, journalist and author.
Outi Heiskanen, 85, Finnish artist, complications from dementia.
József Horváth, 75, Hungarian Olympic handball player (1972).
Harley Hughes, 87, American lieutenant general.
Keith "Wonderboy" Johnson, 50, American gospel singer.
Yvon Lafrance, 78, Canadian politician, Quebec MNA (1989–1994).
Kevin Locke, 68, American flautist and hoop dancer.
Robin Marlar, 91, English cricketer (Cambridge University, Sussex) and journalist.
Brian Mullins, 68, Irish Gaelic football player (St Vincents, Dublin) and manager (Derry).
John Pearce, 82, English footballer (Grimsby Town).
Marvin Powell, 67, American Hall of Fame football player (USC Trojans, New York Jets, Tampa Bay Buccaneers).
Rick Redman, 79, American Hall of Fame football player (Washington Huskies, San Diego Chargers, Portland Storm).
Billy Sothern, 45, American lawyer.
Daniel Soulez Larivière, 80, French lawyer.
Marv Staehle, 80, American baseball player (Chicago White Sox, Montreal Expos, Atlanta Braves).
Colin Touchin, 69, British composer, pancreatic cancer.
Alexandru Vagner, 33, Romanian footballer (Gloria Bistriţa, Târgu Mureș, Brașov), heart attack.
Roger Welsch, 85, American television correspondent (CBS News Sunday Morning) and author.
Dan Wieden, 77, American advertising executive, co-founder of Wieden+Kennedy, coined the slogan Just Do It''.
Yury Zaitsev, 71, Russian weightlifter, Olympic champion (1976).
Khaled Al-Zylaeei, 35, Saudi footballer (Abha, Al-Nassr, national team).

References

2022-9
9